is a passenger railway station located in the town of Sakawa, Takaoka District, Kōchi Prefecture, Japan. It is operated by JR Shikoku and has the station number "K13".

Lines

In addition to the local trains of the Dosan Line, the following limited express services also stop at Sakawa Station:

Layout
The station consists of two opposed side platforms serving three tracks. A station building houses a waiting room and a JR ticket window (without a Midori no Madoguchi facility) as well as a tourist information centre set up by the local municipality. Access to the platform opposite the station building is by a level crossing. A footbridge spans the tracks, allowing access to the station front entrance from the main road on the other side of the tracks. Parking lots are provided.

Adjacent stations

History
At this time the station was operated by Japanese Government Railways, later becoming Japanese National Railways (JNR). With the privatization of JNR on 1 April 1987, control of the station passed to JR Shikoku.

On 4 March 2017, Sakawa town authorities opened a tourist information centre inside the station building using space offered by JR Shikoku. The centre, which is unstaffed, features a custom-built information terminal about Sakawa town, maps and brochures, educational displays as well as a model of a local historic building.

Surrounding area
Sagawa Town Office
Japan National Route 33

See also
 List of Railway Stations in Japan

References

External links

 JR Shikoku timetable

External links
Sakawa Station(JR Shikoku)

Railway stations in Kōchi Prefecture
Railway stations in Japan opened in 1924
Sakawa, Kōchi